1:64 scale is a traditional scale for models and miniatures, in which one unit (such as an inch or a centimeter) on the model represents 64 units on the actual object. It is also known as "three-sixteenths scale", since 3/16 of an inch represents one foot. The scale originated by halving the very common 1:32 scale, which was known as "standard size" in some hobbies.

This scale became successful because of its relative size in comparison to other toys, the fact that it is a derivative of 1/16 scale, and because they are easily held by small hands. The 1/64 scale models will generally have less detail than a 1/16 scale models. Moreover, "1/64 coincides with the S scale of model railroading, part of the consideration of why 1/64 became an established size."

Currently, 1:64 scale is most commonly used for automobile and other vehicle models, but it is also a popular scale for model railroads and toy trains, and has been used for ship models also. In addition, 28mm military and fantasy figures are a popular size for tabletop gaming, and they are sometimes scaled out to 1:64, although opinion on the actual scale of 28mm range from 1:48 to 1:64 with 1:56 being the most common.

Die-cast vehicles

Many diecast automobiles and commercial vehicle models for collectors have been made to a strict scale of 1:64. However, for much of the die-cast toy market, 1:64 is only a nominal scale. Though collectors and manufacturers loosely describe popular lines of die-casts as 1:64, toy vehicles are usually made to "box scale." This means that the size of the model is determined by the size of the standard packaging (formerly a cardstock box, now usually a clear blister-card). Models of a 1959 Cadillac and an Austin Mini-Cooper designed to fill up the same packaging space will have very different actual scales, but for the passenger automobiles in many die-cast lines, 1:64 is a reasonable approximation. Brands of die-cast toys in and around this scale include Hot Wheels, Ertl, GreenLight, Auto World, Code 3, Johnny Lightning, and Jada Toys.

Outside the USA, brands like Matchbox, Maisto, Siku, Norev, Corgi, Tomica, Autoart, Edocar, Kyosho, Tarmac Works, iscale, Time Model, Make Up, Majorette, Schuco, Welly, among many others, are available in this scale.

Model horses
Breyer Animal Creations's brand Mini Whinnies, introduced in 2005, are the smallest scale of Breyer model horses at 1 1/2" high for adults and 1" for foals (1:64 scale). Originally produced by Creata Winner's Choice and sculpted by Candance Liddy, they are aimed at young collectors and usually sold in easy-to-carry packages and playsets; they are currently sold as blind bags.

Slot cars

Small-scale slot cars are often sized to fit a standard motorized chassis and therefore vary somewhat in scale.

The mechanisms have increased in size over the years to generate more power. The so-called "HO" sized slot cars which were introduced in the 1960s at about 1:76 scale, now average around 1:64 scale.

Pictured is an early example of an approximately 1:64 slot car built by Aurora around 1972, as part of its AFX line. This first-generation AMC Matador coupe NASCAR race car replica is designed to fit on an enlarged chassis for nominal HO track.

The 1:64 slot car lines include Micro Scalextric from the maker of the pioneering 1:32 scale slot cars. Tomy-Aurora and Life-Like also produce cars that average close to 1:64. Mattel's diecast Hot Wheels Racing series and the Winner's Circle also have made diecast scenes of 1/64-scale pit crews and race officials that look right with the appropriate NASCAR slot car models.

Wargaming
Metal figures for tabletop wargaming and role-playing gaming are usually not described by scale ratio, but by the approximate height of a human figure, in millimeters. Manufacturers gradually enlarged the standard 25  mm figures of the 1970s, at first describing them as "large 25s,"  or "heroic 25s." By the 1990s, they were simply called 28  mm. figures, and have largely replaced 25s as the standard size for role-playing and many military games. Accessories scaled to match 28  mm gaming figures are generally built to 1:64 scale. More accurate to 1/64 scale car models would actually be the 20mm figures, or approximately 1/72.

Model trains

From the late 1940s to the mid-1960s, 1:64 was a popular scale in the U.S. model railroad market, where it was called S scale or S gauge. It still remains a modestly popular scale, with a dedicated following. A.C. Gilbert, a major toy manufacturer, challenged the predominant O scale (1:48) manufacturers such as Lionel with a fully developed line of 1:64 scale and semi-scale equipment marketed under the American Flyer brand. Because they were 25% smaller than traditional O scale models, they ran on a two-rail track that was more realistic than the traditional 3-rail O gauge track. These features would become standard characteristics of model trains in later years, when the even-smaller HO scale (1:87) took over the model train market from both the O and S scale trains. S-scale survives currently with a small number of manufacturers producing scale equipment for hobbyists and a large number of collectors who seek out the 1950s-era American Flyer equipment to run trains on nostalgic layouts.

Since the 1930s, O scale (1:48) train manufacturers, including Gilbert, Lionel and Marx, have produced bargain or introductory lines of undersized toy trains to run on O-gauge track with very tight curves, known as 0-27 track. Though sold as O gauge, the bodies of these undersized cars and engines were often scaled to 1:64 proportions. The origins of Gilbert's S-gauge equipment can be traced to its American Flyer O-27 line of 1938 and after.

Ships and boats
Kit manufacturers have used 1:64 as a scale for boats and small ships.

See also
 List of scale model sizes

References

Scale model scales
Toy cars and trucks